Vidova is a village in the municipality of Čačak, Serbia. According to the 2011 census, the village has a population of 121 people.

Notable individuals
 Irinej, Serbian Patriarch

References

Populated places in Moravica District